= Dryden Hall =

Building on the Oregon State University campus in Corvallis, Oregon, U.S.

Coordinates: 44.56304°N 123.28507°W

Dryden Hall is a building located at 450 Southwest 30th Street on the Oregon State University campus in Corvallis, Oregon, United States.
